Saint Fiodhairle Ua Suanaigh (or Fidharleus, Fidarle, Fidairle, died 762) was an Irish abbot who was considered to be a saint. His feast day is 1 October.

Life

Fiodhairle Ua Suanaigh was an 8th-century abbot of the monastery in Rahan, County Offaly.
He is said to have belonged to the Hy Fiachrach family, as did Saint Colman of Kilmacduach, and to have been brother to Fiodhmuine Ua Suanaigh.
The Bollandists refer to Colgan and give his feast day as 1 October.
The Martyrology of Tallaght also says his feast day was 1 October.
The Martyrology of Marianus O'Gorman says he was a "white-fair prince" and notes his Suanach descent and Rathen abbey.
The 17th-century Martyrology of Donegal says he died in 762.

Older spellings of the Rahan abbey name are Rathen, Raithen and Raithean, meaning "ferney place". 
The O'Swany (Ua Suanaigh) family were the hereditary successors to Saint Carthage at the abbey from the 8th century.
Fiodhairle repaired the abbey after a Viking raid.

Monks of Ramsgate account

The monks of St Augustine's Abbey, Ramsgate, wrote in their Book of Saints (1921),

Butler's account

The hagiographer Alban Butler wrote in his Lives of the fathers, martyrs, and other principal saints,

Notes

Sources

 

 

Medieval saints of Leinster
762 deaths